is a 1963 Japanese drama film directed by Susumu Hani. It was entered into the 14th Berlin International Film Festival where Sachiko Hidari won the Silver Bear for Best Actress award.

Plot
A middle-class woman in Tokyo, Naoko Ishikawa (Sachiko Hidari) lives with her husband in a shining new apartment building on a hill overlooking a slum. As her husband Eiichi (Eiji Okada) becomes more entangled in his life as businessman, Naoko looks for ways to expand her own life even as her husband's life shrinks in scope and intimacy. She loses her sense of security when she becomes acquainted with poverty in her neighborhood. She finds herself strangely drawn to a rag-picker, Ikona (Kikuji Yamashita) who lives down below in a tin shack with a blind child and a dog, and the sheltering comforts of her middle-class existence inexorably fall away.

Cast
 Sachiko Hidari - Naoko Ishikawa
 Kikuji Yamashita - Ikona
 Eiji Okada - Eiichi Ishikawa
 Akio Hasegawa - Laundry Boy
 Yoshimi Hiramatsu - Nakano
 Setsuko Horikoshi - Old lady of book store
 Takanobu Hozumi - Doctor
 Hiromi Ichida - Nurse
 Mariko Igarashi - Blind girl
 Hiro Kasai - Ghetto guy
 Shûji Kawabe - Detective
 Toshie Kimura - Sasaki
 Masakazu Kuwayama - Laundry owner
 Toshio Matsumoto - Laundry man
 Yukio Ninagawa - Balloon guy
 Kazuya Oguri
 Miyoko Takahashi - Ghetto woman

Awards 
In 1964, Sachiko Hidari also won the Silver Bear for Best Actress at the 14th Berlin International Film Festival for her film The Insect Woman directed by Shohei Imamura. The film was nominated for Golden Bear, but won OCIC Award and Youth Film Award for best feature film.
In Japan, Hidari won Best Actress at Blue Ribbon Award, Mainichi Film Award and Kinema Junpo Award.

References

External links

1963 films
1963 drama films
Japanese black-and-white films
Films directed by Susumu Hani
1960s Japanese-language films
1960s Japanese films
Japanese drama films